A charlatan (also called a swindler or mountebank) is a person practicing quackery or a similar confidence trick in order to obtain money, power, fame, or other advantages through pretense or deception. One example of a Charlatan is The Pardoner of "The Canterbury Tales" who tricks sinners into buying fake religious relics.  Synonyms for charlatan include shyster, quack, or faker. Quack is a reference to quackery or the practice of dubious medicine, including the sale of snake oil, or a person who does not have medical training who purports to provide medical services.

Etymology
The word comes from French , a seller of medicines who might advertise his presence with music and an outdoor stage show. The best known of the Parisian charlatans was Tabarin, whose skits and farces were influenced by commedia dell'arte inspired Molière. The word can also be traced to Spanish , an indiscreetly talkative person, a chatterbox. Ultimately, etymologists trace charlatan from either the Italian , to chatter or prattle; or from Cerretano, a resident of Cerreto, a village in Umbria, known for its quacks.

Usage 

A distinction is drawn between the charlatan and other kinds of confidence tricksters. The charlatan is usually a salesperson of a certain service or product, who has no personal relationship with his "marks" (customers or clients), and avoids elaborate hoaxes or roleplaying con-games. Rather, the person called a charlatan is being accused of resorting to quackery, pseudoscience, or other knowingly employed bogus means of impressing people in order to swindle victims by selling them worthless nostrums and similar goods or services that will not deliver on the promises made for them. One example of a charlatan is a 19th-century medicine show operator, who has long since left town by the time the people who bought his "snake oil" or similarly named "cure-all" tonic realize that it was a scam. A misdirection by a charlatan is a confuddle, a dropper is a leader of a group of conmen, and hangmen are conmen that present false checks. A gaff means to trick or con and a mugu is a victim of a rigged game.

In reported spiritual communications, a charlatan is a person who fakes evidence that a spirit is "making contact" with the medium and seekers. Notable people who have successfully debunked the claims of purported supernatural mediums include magician/scientific skeptic James Randi, Brazilian writer Monteiro Lobato and magician Harry Houdini.

Infamous individuals

 Albert Abrams, the advocate of radionics and other similar electrical quackery who was active in the early twentieth century.
 John R. Brinkley, the "goat-gland doctor" who implanted goat glands as a means of curing male impotence, helped pioneer both American and Mexican radio broadcasting, and twice ran unsuccessfully for governor of Kansas.
 Alfredo Bowman, who claimed to cure all disease with herbs and a unique vegan, alkaline diet.
 Alessandro Cagliostro, (real name Giuseppe Balsamo) who claimed to be a count.
 Billie Sol Estes, a famous Texas conman.
 Gustavus Katterfelto, a Prussian conjurer who used a solar microscope which he claimed could detect disease.
 Ivar Kreuger, the Swedish "Match King", who ran a worldwide Ponzi scheme in the 1920s.
 Bernard Madoff, an American stockbroker who ran the world's largest Ponzi scheme, defrauding investors out of $18 billion.
 Elisha Perkins, the inventor of his own quack therapy that utilized "tractors".
 John Henry Pinkard, Roanoke businessman and purveyor of quack medicines.
 Charles Ponzi, for whom the "Ponzi scheme" is named, a scam that relies on a "pyramid" of "investors" who contribute money to a fraudulent programme, typically where monies from later investors are used to pay unusually high returns to earlier investors, thus allowing and promoting the growth of the scheme.
 Gert Postel, a German fraud who feigned experience in the field of psychiatry and became a senior physician, despite having no training.
 Grigori Rasputin, a self-proclaimed holy man and healer who gained considerable influence on the family of Tsar Nicholas II and was involved in the political turmoil on the brink of the Russian Revolution.

See also 
 Cerreto di Spoleto
 Confidence trick
 Fraud
 Impostor
 Poseur
 Pseudoscience
 Quackery

References

Further reading
 Brock, Pope. (2009). Charlatan: The Fraudulent Life of John Brinkley. Phoenix.  
 Humbertclaude, Éric. Récréations de Hultazob Paris: L'Harmattan 2010,  (sur Melech August Hultazob, médecin-charlatan des Lumières Allemandes assassiné en 1743)
 Riordan, Timothy B. (2009). Prince of Quacks: The Notorious Life of Dr. Francis Tumblety, Charlatan and Jack the Ripper Suspect. McFarland. 
 Porter, Roy. (2003). Quacks: Fakers and Charlatans in Medicine. NPI Media Group. 
Stratmann, Linda. (2010). Fraudsters and Charlatans: A Peek at some of History's Greatest Rogues. The History Press.

External links
 

Deception
Pseudoscience